Not a Pretty Picture is a 1976 American docudrama film. The film was written, produced and directed by Martha Coolidge, marking her narrative feature film directorial debut, after years of working as a documentary filmmaker in the early to mid-1970s.

The film is a retelling about Coolidge, who was date raped when she was sixteen years old. The film follows the aftermath of the incident on the main character. In 2022, The Academy Film Archive in partnership with Martin Scorsese's Film Foundation restored 'Not a Pretty Picture', with funds generously provided by the George Lucas Family Foundation. The Restoration premiered on December 8th 2022 at the Academy Museum in Hollywood. In 2023 Not a Pretty Picture screened at Berlinale, Selected by Céline Sciamma.

Cast
Michele Manenti as Martha at 16
Jim Carrington as Curly
Anne Mundstuk as herself
Reed Birney as Fred
John Fedinatz as West Virginia
Diana Gold as Jane
Stephen Laurier as Brian
Lillah McCarthy as Nancy
Janet Morrison as Bunny
Melissa Murdock as Leah
Hal Studer as Mr. Cullen
Amy Wright	as Cindy

References

External links
 
 

1976 directorial debut films
1976 drama films
1976 films
American drama films
American docudrama films
Films about rape
American films based on actual events
Films directed by Martha Coolidge
1970s English-language films
1970s American films